Rabbit Hill is an unincorporated community in Bryan County, in the U.S. state of Georgia.

History
According to tradition, the community was named from the habit of local residents of eating rabbit meat.

References

Unincorporated communities in Bryan County, Georgia